New Zealand at the 1970 British Commonwealth Games was represented by a team of 65 competitors and 19 officials. Selection of the team for the Games in Edinburgh, Scotland, was the responsibility of the New Zealand Olympic and British Commonwealth Games Association. New Zealand's flagbearer at the opening ceremony was field athlete Les Mills.  The New Zealand team finished 11th on the medal table, winning a total of 14 medals, two of which were gold.

New Zealand has competed in every games, starting with the British Empire Games in 1930 at Hamilton, Ontario.

Medal tables
New Zealand was 11th in the medal table in 1970, with a total of 14 medals, including two gold.

Athletics

Track and road

Field

Combined

Badminton

Boxing

Cycling

Road
Men's road race

Track

Men's 1000 m sprint

Men's tandem 2000 m sprint

Men's 1 km time trial

Men's 4000 m individual pursuit

Men's 10 miles scratch race

Diving

Fencing

Men

Individual
Épée

Foil

Sabre

Team

Women

Individual
Foil

Team

Lawn bowls

Swimming

Weightlifting

Wrestling

Officials
 Team manager – Joe McManemin
 Assistant team manager – Ian Palmer
 Chaperone – E. M. McKenna
 Team doctor – Mayne Smeeton
 Physiotherapist – Stanley Paris
 Athletics
 Section manager – Barry Kerr
 Coach – S. Johnson
 Badminton section manager – Roger Dunn
 Boxing section manager – Wally Darrell
 Cycling
 Section manager – D. B. Smith
 Coach / mechanic – Warwick Dalton
 Lawn bowls section manager – A. J. McDonald
 Swimming
 Section manager – Laurie Crabb
 Coach – Pic Parkhouse
 Weightlifting
 Section manager – R. E. Hosking
 Coach – H. Morrison
 Wrestling
 Section manager – Jack McInnes
 Coach – John Armitt

See also
New Zealand Olympic Committee 
New Zealand at the Commonwealth Games
New Zealand at the 1968 Summer Olympics
New Zealand at the 1972 Summer Olympics

References

External links
NZOC website on the 1970 games 
Commonwealth Games Federation website

1970
Nations at the 1970 British Commonwealth Games
British Commonwealth Games